Hohburg is a former municipality in the Leipzig district in Saxony. With effect from 1 January 2012, it has merged with Falkenhain, forming the new municipality of Lossatal.

The composer and musicologist Friedbert Streller was born in the village on 21 December 1931.

References 

Former municipalities in Saxony
Leipzig (district)